This is a list of franchise records for the Tampa Bay Lightning of the National Hockey League (updated though the 2021–22 NHL season).

Career regular season leaders

Skaters

Goaltenders

Single season records

Skaters

Goaltenders

Career playoff leaders

Skaters

Goaltenders

See also
List of Tampa Bay Lightning players
List of Tampa Bay Lightning seasons

References

External links
Hockey-Reference – Tampa Bay Lightning Franchise Index

Records
National Hockey League statistical records